Holliday Creek may refer to:

Holliday Creek (Missouri), a stream in Missouri
Holliday Creek (Wichita River tributary), a stream in Texas